Brahim Daoud Abdoulaye (born August 27, 1970) is a track and field sprint athlete who competed internationally for Chad

Hassane represented Chad at the 1996 Summer Olympics in Atlanta. He competed in the 200 metres where he finished seventh in his heat so didn't qualify for the next round.

References

1970 births
Living people
Chadian male sprinters
Olympic athletes of Chad
Athletes (track and field) at the 1996 Summer Olympics